The 1923 Michigan State Normal Normalites football team represented Michigan State Normal College (later renamed Eastern Michigan University) during the 1923 college football season.  In their first season under head coach James M. Brown, the Normalites compiled a record of 2–5–1 and were outscored by their opponents by a combined total of 104 to 55. Malcolm I. Dickie was the team captain.

Schedule

References

Michigan State Normal
Eastern Michigan Eagles football seasons
Michigan State Normal Normalites football